Long Point may refer to:

Antarctica
Long Point (South Georgia), on Barff Peninsula, South Georgia Island

Australia
Long Point, New South Wales, a suburb of Sydney

Canada
Long Point, Ontario, a sand spit projecting into Lake Erie in Ontario
Long Point Biosphere Reserve, a United Nations designated area of 40,600 ha (terrestrial and marine)
Long Point National Wildlife Area, a 3,650 ha National Wildlife Area in Canada
Long Point Provincial Park, an Ontario Provincial Park of 150 ha
Long Point, Nova Scotia, a community along the shore of St. George's Bay
 Long Point (Manitoba), a continuation of The Pas Moraine near the Saskatchewan River

United States
Long Point, Illinois, a village
Long Point, Iowa, an unincorporated community
Long Point, Texas, an unincorporated community
Long Point (Cape Cod), a spit that extends into Cape Cod Bay, in Provincetown, Massachusetts
Long Point Light, the historic lighthouse at the tip of Cape Cod

See also
 Longue Pointe (Québec), Canada, a point in Hudson Bay